Þórhallur Sveinsson (born 13 June 1944) is an Icelandic cross-country skier. He competed in the men's 15 kilometre event at the 1964 Winter Olympics.

References

1944 births
Living people
Icelandic male cross-country skiers
Olympic cross-country skiers of Iceland
Cross-country skiers at the 1964 Winter Olympics
20th-century Icelandic people